Cacia flavomaculipennis is a species of beetle in the family Cerambycidae. It was described by Stephan von Breuning in 1974. It is known from the Philippines.

References

Cacia (beetle)
Beetles described in 1974